Rocky River, a watercourse of the Gwydir catchment within the Murray–Darling basin, is located in the Northern Tablelands district of New South Wales, Australia.

Sourced from the western slopes of the Great Dividing Range, the river rises at First Creek Falls on Kentucky Creek, at Rocky River, west of Uralla, and flows generally to the north and north-west, before reaching its confluence with the Boorolong Creek to form Gwydir River, south of Yarrowyck; descending  over its  course.

See also

 Rivers of New South Wales
 List of rivers of Australia

References

External links
 

Rivers of New South Wales
New England (New South Wales)
Murray-Darling basin